Emy Pettersson (22 November 1908 – 8 May 1996) was a Swedish sprinter. She competed in the women's 4 × 100 metres relay and the 800 meters at the 1928 Summer Olympics and was eliminated in the preliminary heats in both events.

References

External links
 

1908 births
1996 deaths
Athletes (track and field) at the 1928 Summer Olympics
Swedish female sprinters
Swedish female middle-distance runners
Olympic athletes of Sweden
Place of birth missing
Olympic female sprinters